Woolworths Holdings Limited is a South African multinational retail company that owns the South African retail chain Woolworths, and Australian retailer Country Road Group. Woolworths, however, has no association to Australia's Woolworths supermarket chain.

The South African Woolworths business consists of full-line fashion, home and beauty stores, many of which incorporate a premium food retail offering. Stand-alone food stores and "Food Stops" attached to Engen petrol stations are also located in urban areas. Woolworths operates 155 full line stores, 52 Fashion, Beauty and Home only stores and 194 food stand alone stores in South Africa, with 68 stores throughout the rest of Africa. Woolworths sells clothing and accessory items under a number of premium brands, namely Studio W, RE: and Edition, with the Group's Australian brands Country Road, Witchery and Trenery also represented.

The Group's Australian-based specialty apparel and homewares retail subsidiary Country Road Group operates 557 stores (and a further 242 concession locations within David Jones), The Group operates under separate brands Country Road, Witchery, Trenery, Mimco and Politix.

History

Founded by Max Sonnenberg, Woolworths first opened its doors on 30 October 1931 in Plein Street Cape Town, in the dining room of the recently closed down Royal Hotel. It was an immediate success, and two more stores were opened in the Cape. It was clear that the new business had the potential to expand nationwide except for a lack of capital. Sonnenberg's friend Elie Susman put up the money for the expansion of the business into the Transvaal and became Sonnenberg's business partner.
The choice of name came from Sonnenberg's friendship with a London shipper and financier called Percy (P.R.) Lewis. Lewis was a director of Australasian Chain Stores, ACS, a London shipping and finance house that had been formed to service a rapidly expanding Australian business founded by W.T. Christmas. London shippers commonly provided finance and often selected goods, sight unseen, which were dispatched to their clients. Given that the (now defunct) American company F.W Woolworth Company had no desire to trade in Australia, "Father" Christmas as he was known, used the name for his new Woolworths enterprise.  Lewis proposed to Sonnenberg that ACS could add to 'Father' Christmas's order sheet and send a scaled-down quantity of every item that was succeeding in Australia, to South Africa. Sonnenberg therefore also adopted the name for his new venture. Two years later, a South African court ruled that sufficient goodwill had been established to refuse an injunction brought against the use of the name by the American retailer.

Corporate Affairs and Culture

Good Business Journey
Started in 2007, the Good Business Journey set specific public targets in sustainability for the company. It also aims to achieve a consistent approach to sustainability issues across its global supply chain, as part of Woolworths' declared target of being the most sustainable retailer in the southern hemisphere.

In 2016, the company launched its GBJ goals through to 2020  including embedding the programme into the Group's Australian businesses which now account for over forty per cent of turnover.

The WHL Group GBJ 2020 commitments include: contributing over R3.5-billion across the Group to communities over the next 5 years; saving 500 billion litres of water over 5 years; ensuring the company halves its energy impact by 2020 and achieves 100% clean energy by 2030; driving responsible sourcing of all key commodities by 2020; and affirming that every private-label product sold has at least one sustainability attribute by 2020.

Sustainable development goals

Zero packaging waste to landfill
In June 2018, Woolworths announced its intention to achieve zero packaging waste to landfill by 2022, aiming to have none of their packaging end up in landfills, which would require a 100% recyclable material for its packaging and a supportive recycling infrastructure. Woolworths also committed to phasing out single-use plastic shopping bags completely by 2020.

In August 2018, the Palmyra store in Claremont introduced in-store recycling vending machines.

Reusable bags 
As part of the phasing out of plastic bags, Woolworths launched a new in-store reusable bag trial in October 2018.

Starting on 5 November 2018, these new, entry level, reusable shopping bags were made available in four stores across the Western Cape (V&A Waterfront, Palmyra, Pinelands and Steenberg), and have since been distributed to additional stores.

Woolworths Steenberg went completely plastic bag free for the duration of the trial, with customers having the choice of either purchasing a reusable bag or bringing their own bags. In the remaining three stores, the current single-use plastic bags were still available. April 2019, additional plastic bag free stores were announced in Maroun Square, Moreleta Village and Delcairn Centre.

Partnership with Pharrell Williams
In 2015, Woolworths announced a partnership with Grammy Award-winning musician, record producer and philanthropist, Pharrell Williams. The strategic collaboration was the first of its kind for a South African retailer.

Williams took on the role of Style Director in a collaboration across a series of sustainability-focused projects. The campaign had four layers: entertainment, showcasing young talent, fundraising for education, and driving sustainable fashion.

Black Economic Empowerment Employee Share Ownership Scheme
In July 2015, Woolworths announced the maturity of its Black Economic Empowerment Employee Share Ownership Scheme (BEEESOS).

The scheme was launched in 2007 as part of the company's Good Business Journey and is one element of the company's commitment to socio-economic transformation. Woolworths was the first retailer to launch an empowerment scheme with BEEESOS shares allocated to previously disadvantaged employees on the basis of both length of service and seniority.  The scheme represented approximately 10% of the ordinary share capital of Woolworths at the time.

The strong performance of the business over the past eight years has created R2.4 billion for the participants, who have also enjoyed dividends of R332 million during the life of the scheme.

World Retail Congress’s International Women in Retail: Woman of the Year award
Zyda Rylands, CEO of Woolworths South Africa received the inaugural Woman of The Year award at the World Retail Congress's International Women in Retail Reception held on 5 April 2017.

Zyda was given the special award in recognition of her work, both as an international leader, philanthropist and for her outstanding commercial success. Rylands joined Woolworths in 1996 and worked in the finance and store operation teams. She was appointed the People and Transformation Director of Woolworths in 2005 and was appointed to the Board in August 2006.

Controversies

Christian magazines
In October 2010, Woolworths came under fire as they opted to remove Christian magazines from their shelves and discontinue their sale. This was met with a huge outcry from the Christian community, many voicing that they would boycott the chain store. Woolworths maintained it was strictly a business decision, with CEO Simon Susman attributing their decision to diminishing number of sales. Woolworths returned the five magazines to its shelves following a public outcry.

Affirmative action

	
In September 2012 Woolworths was accused of racism by some groups for allegedly discriminating against white job applicants and staff. The accusations followed after claims that the retailer's advertising on their career site said its jobs are only open to "African, Coloured and Indian" candidates. Shortly after the incident, Woolworths changed the advert text to say "In accordance with Woolworths' Employment Equity approach, preference will be given to candidates from designated groups".

Plagiarism

Pillow designs 
In October 2013, rumours of plagiarism surfaced when Euodia Roets, a South African artist, accused Woolworths of using her designs that were kept as samples after contract negotiations failed. In her article Euodia Roets shows illustrative images of her design and compares it to a cushion later sold by Woolworths on which a strikingly similar design was used. Woolworths denied these allegations on their website. In her allegations Euodia Roets also claimed "If that text is in fact from Wikipedia, Wiki requires attribution on all commercial use of their text. You'd be correct in assuming Woolies did no such thing." 
 	
The text used on the design is an exact match of portions of text lifted from Wikipedia's Hummingbird article, without attribution, in violation of its Creative Commons License.  When pressed on the matter, the official Woolworths South Africa Twitter account opined that "We've checked with our lawyer; Wikipedia does not own the content."

Baby carriers 
In January 2019, Woolworths withdrew a line of baby carriers the design of which was allegedly copied from a domestic South African designer and manufacturer (Ubuntu Baba) and sold at one third the price of Ubuntu Baba's version. The baby carrier scandal broke out after Shannon McLaughlin of Ubuntu Baba wrote a blog post about it that then became a popular issue on social media.  McLaughlin alleged that a number of Ubuntu's carriers were purchased by and delivered to Woolworths Head Office in June 2017 around a year before the Woolworths carriers hit the market. Woolworths admitted that their baby carriers were derivatives of McLaughlin's product and issued an apology.

Soft drink imitation
In early 2012, the South African Advertising Standards Authority ruled that Woolworths' vintage cold drink range was an imitation of Frankie's Soft Drinks range.  It was ruled that Woolworths intentionally copied the phrase "Good Old Fashioned Soft Drinks" to promote its own line of beverages thereby infringing on the rights of Frankie's Soft Drinks.  Woolworths agreed to remove the range immediately. After the event Woolworths South Africa's CEO Ian Moir publicly stated that "Public opinion is so much against us and, whether we're right or whether we're wrong, customer opinion is against us."

References

External links 

 Official website

Holding companies of South Africa
Department stores of South Africa
Supermarkets of South Africa
Companies based in Cape Town
Holding companies established in 1931
Retail companies established in 1931
1931 establishments in South Africa
Companies listed on the Johannesburg Stock Exchange
South African brands